Allen Hopkins (born November 18, 1951) is an American professional pocket billiards (pool) player, professional billiards color commentator and BCA Hall of Fame inductee. He promotes multiple annual pool events and still competes as a professional contender.

Early life
Allen Hopkins was born November 18, 1951 in Elizabeth, New Jersey) and was raised in the small suburban town of Cranford, New Jersey by adoptive parents Paul and Marietta Hopkins.

Amateur days
At seven years old, after watching many tournaments on television, Allen began to play pool on a small table his parents bought for him.  As an amateur, at the age of 12, Hopkins  a prodigious 110 balls and took this talent to play against grown men.

Pool career
Hopkins' professional career began in the 1970s and spans over four decades.  He co-founded and served on the board the now-defunct Professional Pool Players Association (PPPA), as well as president of the Professional Billiard Association (PBA).

At the 1979 PPPA World Open 14.1 Pocket Billiard Championship in New York City, New York, Hopkins posted the largest victory margin in the event, defeating Richie Florence, 150-1.

Allen Hopkins has earned titles in such varied events as the 1977 World Straight Pool Championship, the 1978 and 1981 U.S. Open 9-Ball Championships, the 1990 Cleveland Open 10-Ball Classic and the 1991 Legends of One-Pocket event.

In both 1986 and 1987, Hopkins was the All Japan Championship all around champion.

In 1993, he saw victory in the International Challenge of Champions.

Allen Hopkins has a high run of 410 in straight pool (14.1 continuous), and has run 15-and-out three times, in the game of one-pocket.

In 2002, Hopkins triumphed in the Denver Ten-ball Open, defeating Earl Strickland, Filipino champion Jose Parica, Corey Deuel, David Matlock, and faced Shannon Daulton in a thrilling double-hill finals.

In 2008, he was inducted to the BCA Hall of Fame by the Billiard Congress of America.

Titles
 1972 Hi-Cue Warm Up 14.1 Championship
 1973 Palmer Cue Open 14.1 Championship
 1973 Garden State 14.1 Championship
 1973 New Jersey State 14.1 Championship
 1974 Empire Billiards 14.1 Championship
 1974 New Jersey State 14.1 Championship
 1977 PPPA World Straight Pool Championship
 1978 U.S. Open Nine-ball Championship
 1980 Baltimore Bullet 9-Ball Open
 1981 Cue Club 9-Ball Open
 1981 U.S. Open Nine-ball Championship
 1983 Meucci Rivermont 9-Ball Championship
 1984 Texas River City 9-Ball Open
 1985 B.C. Open 9-Ball Pro-Am Doubles 
 1986 Atlanta Open 9-Ball
 1986 All Japan Championship 14.1
 1986 All Japan Championship All-Around 
 1987 Eastern States 9-Ball Open 
 1987 Meucci 9-Ball Championship
 1987 All Japan Championship 14.1
 1987 All Japan Championship Rotation
 1987 All Japan Championship All-Around
 1988 Coors Valley Forge 9-Ball Open 
 1990 River City Invitational Nine-Ball
 1990 Cleveland Open 10-Ball Classic 
 1990 Rocket City 9-Ball Champioonship
 1991 Legends of One-Pocket Championship
 1991 Billiards Digest Best One-Pocket Player 
 1993 International Challenge of Champions
 1996 Hollywood Park Challenge
 1996 Mosconi Cup
 2002 Denver 10-Ball Open 
 2003 Border Battle, Team USA VS Team Canada
 2008 Billiard Congress of America Hall of Fame
 2010 One Pocket Hall of Fame

Sportscasting and event promotion
Allen Hopkins Productions started the Super Billiards Expo, each year held in Valley Forge, Pennsylvania, which has since become the biggest  consumer-oriented trade show in the Billiards industry trade show in the world, with multiple tournaments for amateur, seniors, women and men professional player levels.

He has combined efforts with Billiards International and promoted pocket billiards exhibitions like the Skins Billiards Championship, the Texas Hold'em Billiards Championship, and two short-lived competitions, the Million Dollar Nine-Ball Shootout, and (with business partner Mike Andrews) the Team DMIRO tour.

References

American pool players
Sportspeople from Elizabeth, New Jersey
Pool writers and broadcasters
1951 births
Living people